The Hawker 4000, originally known as the Hawker Horizon, is a super-midsize business jet developed by Hawker Beechcraft (formerly Raytheon Aircraft Company).

Development

Raytheon announced a new business jet in November 1996 as a larger aircraft than the existing Hawker 1000 that formed the top of Raytheon's jet range. The design, then known as the Hawker Horizon, was intended to fly in 1999, with certification and initial customer deliveries planned for 2001.

The first prototype made its maiden flight on August 11, 2001, with the second prototype and third prototypes making their maiden flights on May 10 and July 31, 2002. It made its public debut in November 2002 when a development aircraft was displayed at the National Business Aviation Association (NBAA) convention. As of March 2007 orders totaled more than 130 aircraft, with deliveries scheduled to begin in June 2008.  On December 2, 2005 NetJets signed an order for 50 of the new aircraft, the largest single commercial order in the history of Raytheon Aircraft.

The Hawker 4000 was certified to FAA FAR Part 25 standards, which places a five-year time limit on certification of a new transport category aircraft. The 4000 completed Function and Reliability Tests on May 25, 2006. During September 2005, a prototype underwent testing at the McKinley Climatic Laboratory at Eglin Air Force Base, Florida.  However, since the Part 25 five-year window expired May 31, 2006, the company filed an extension request to head off the possibility that the certification program would need to restart from the beginning. On November 21, 2006, the company announced that the 4000 had received its FAA type certification.

In May 2008, BJETS completed an order for ten Hawker 4000 business jets from Hawker Beechcraft Corporation. The contract value including all options exercised was said to be in excess of $330 million. The deal was announced at EBACE on May 20, 2008. and Following the BJETS order, Hawker Beechcraft delivered its Hawker 4000 super-midsized business jet to customer Jack P. DeBoer during a special ceremony at the company's Customer Delivery Center in Wichita, Kan. At the time, the Hawker 4000 was the first aircraft in its class to use carbon composite construction.

The Hawker 4000 received its certification from the Civil Aviation Administration of China in December 2009. In February 2010, Hawker Beechcraft delivered its first Hawker 4000 to a customer in mainland China.

As of May 2013, Hawker-Beechcraft is offering its jet division, including the Hawker 4000 project, for sale. The company intends to focus on propeller-driven aircraft; leaving the future of the Hawker 4000 up to an eventual buyer.

By 2018, 2008-2010 Hawker 4000s were priced around $4 million, at the engines’ scrap value.

Design

The Hawker 4000 can be outfitted to seat ten people. The aircraft's carbon composite construction gives it more interior space than many jets in its class. Interior standing room is an average of six feet. The flight deck features a Honeywell Primus Epic avionics suite with EICAS, FADEC and autothrottle.

Specifications

See also

References
Notes

Bibliography

External links

 Hawker 4000 on the Hawker Beechcraft website
 Hawker Beechcraft Delivers First Hawker 4000 

Beechcraft aircraft
Raytheon Company products
2000s United States business aircraft
Twinjets
Low-wing aircraft
T-tail aircraft
Aircraft first flown in 2001